Les McNicol (9 March 1932 – 16 February 2013) was a New Zealand rugby league player who represented New Zealand on the 1955–56 tour of Great Britain and France.

References

1932 births
2013 deaths
New Zealand rugby league players
New Zealand national rugby league team players
West Coast rugby league team players
Rugby league wingers